Joseph Patrick O’Carroll (21 March 1891 – 9 June 1965) was an Australian politician who was a Member of the Victorian Legislative Assembly for the Electoral district of Clifton Hill representing the Labor Party from 1949–1955 and the Australian Labor Party (Anti-Communist) (Democratic Labor Party) from March–April 1955.

He also was an Australian rules footballer who played with Melbourne in the Victorian Football League (VFL).

Notes

External links 

 

1891 births
1965 deaths
Australian Labor Party members of the Parliament of Victoria
Democratic Labor Party (historical) members of the Parliament of Victoria
Members of the Victorian Legislative Assembly
Australian rules footballers from Victoria (Australia)
Melbourne Football Club players
People educated at Parade College
Australian sportsperson-politicians
20th-century Australian politicians
Australian rules footballers from Queensland